is a former Japanese football player. He played for Japan national team.

Club career
Yokotani was born in Kyoto Prefecture on May 10, 1952. After graduating from Hosei University, he joined Hitachi in 1975. The club won 1975 Emperor's Cup and 1976 JSL Cup. He moved to Division 2 club All Nippon Airways in 1984. In 1984, the club was promoted to Division 1. He retired in 1986.

National team career
On July 23, 1974, when Yokotani was a Hosei University student, he debuted for Japan national team against Romania. He also played at 1976 Asian Cup qualification and 1978 World Cup qualification. He played 20 games for Japan until 1977.

Club statistics

National team statistics

References

External links
 
 Japan National Football Team Database

1952 births
Living people
Hosei University alumni
Association football people from Kyoto Prefecture
Japanese footballers
Japan international footballers
Japan Soccer League players
Kashiwa Reysol players
Yokohama Flügels players
Association football defenders